Leo Richardson is an American former basketball and football coach. Richardson was the head basketball coach at Savannah State University from 1964 to 1971, and the University at Buffalo from 1973 to 1978. He compiled an overall basketball coaching record of 146–176. Richardson led the Savannah State basketball team to a Southern Intercollegiate Athletic Conference conference tournament title in 1970, for which he was named coach of the year. He was the University at Buffalo's first African American head basketball coach. He also served as the head football coach at Savannah State from 1964 to 1968, compiling a record of 13–25–2. Richardson was elected to the Savannah State University Sports Hall of Fame in 2010.

Richardson was born in Gresham, South Carolina and attended elementary and high school in Loris, South Carolina. He played football and basketball at Morris College in Sumter, South Carolina before graduating in 1954. Richardson then coached football and basketball at A. L. Corbett High School in Wagener, South Carolina. Richardson earned a master's degree from the Tuskegee Institute—now known as Tuskegee University—in 1961.

Head coaching record

Football

Basketball

References

External links
 Savannah State profile

Year of birth missing (living people)
Living people
American football guards
Buffalo Bulls men's basketball coaches
Morris Hornets athletic directors
Morris Hornets football coaches
Morris Hornets football players
Morris Hornets men's basketball coaches
Morris Hornets men's basketball players
Savannah State Tigers basketball coaches
Savannah State Tigers football coaches
High school basketball coaches in South Carolina
High school football coaches in South Carolina
Tuskegee University alumni
People from Loris, South Carolina
People from Marion County, South Carolina
Coaches of American football from South Carolina
Players of American football from South Carolina
Basketball coaches from South Carolina
Basketball players from South Carolina
African-American coaches of American football
African-American players of American football
African-American basketball coaches
African-American basketball players
20th-century African-American sportspeople